Clubul Sportiv Gilortul Târgu Cărbunești, commonly known as Gilortul Târgu Cărbunești, is a Romanian professional football club from Târgu Cărbunești, Gorj County.

Honours
Liga IV – Gorj County
Winners (8): 1990–91, 1997–98, 1998–99, 2004–05, 2013–14, 2014–15, 2015–16, 2018–19
Runners-up (1):  2012–13
Cupa României – Gorj County
Winners (2): 2013–14, 2014–15
Runners-up (1): 2012–13

Players

First team squad

}

Out on loan

}

Club officials

Board of directors

Current technical staff

League history

References

Football clubs in Gorj County
Association football clubs established in 1976
Liga III clubs
Liga IV clubs
1976 establishments in Romania